Glaber, a Latin word meaning bald, may refer to :
 Arduin Glaber  (died c. 977), the Count of Auriate from c. 935 and Margrave of Turin from c. 950
 Gaius Claudius Glaber, a Roman praetor in 73 BC. that failed to hem in Spartacus and his fellow slaves on Mt. Vesuvius during the Third Servile War
 Rodulfus Glaber (985–1047), a monk and chronicler of the years around 1000 and is one of the chief sources for the history of France in that period

See also 
 includes several species names
List of Latin and Greek words commonly used in systematic names
 Glabrousness